Nico Casavecchia (born Nicolás Casavecchia; May 13, 1981) is an Argentine director, screenwriter and illustrator. His work includes music videos, commercials and film, often employing mix media techniques ranging from animation to live action. Casavecchia most notably directed A Boy and His Atom (2013) a stop-motion animated short film created by IBM Research scientists, made by moving carbon monoxide molecules. The movie has been recognized by the Guinness Book of World Records as the World's Smallest Stop-Motion Film.

Life and career
Casavecchia was born and raised in Buenos Aires, Argentina. He studied graphic design in the University of Buenos Aires for 8 months and has been an autodidact ever since. His professional career began while working for graphic design studios and advertising agencies. In 2001 he won the first edition of OFFF festival in the ARTS category and moved to Barcelona where he lived for the following 11 years. Later, in 2004, Casavecchia co-funded AÄB, a multi disciplinary studio together with his partners  Hernan Curioni and Agustín Verrastro. In AÄB he explored different filmmaking techniques influenced by Verrastro's expertise in animation and Curioni's talent in Art direction and illustration. After AÄB's dissolution, Casavecchia started directing under his own name.
Since December 2012 Casavecchia has lived in Brooklyn and collaborates with the production company 1st Avenue Machine as member of their roster of directors.

Short films
In 2009 Casavecchia directed Salesman in the Mirror, a 9 minutes comedy following a pivotal night in the life of a frustrated director of commercials traveling to Barcelona. The film was distributed by Future Shorts. In 2010 he released (with Sebastian Baptista) Buildings & Vampires, a tribute to the movie Where the Wild Things Are by Spike Jonze. In the short Casavecchia and Baptista employ part of the original movie soundtrack to re create the story Max tell his mother. The short story comes to life in a multi-technique animation sequence. Buildings and Vampires was showcased in festivals around the world.
In 2016 it premiered his first feature film, Finding Sofia.

Public speakings
Casavecchia has participated in various international conferences as a public speaker. The talks explore the themes of failure, creativity and hybrid disciplines and are frequently illustrated with personal experiences and anecdotes of his own career. The conferences evolve and change depending on the venue but are always titled Story of my professional failures.

Awards
In 2013 A Boy and His Atom won a Golden and Bronze lion at the Cannes Lions International Advertising Festival. In 2014 it also won the AICP NEXT Award. Casavecchia's work have won Golden Laus in 2009 and was nominated for awards in Siggraph, Viedram Film Festival, and Netherlands Film Festival.

References

External links 
Salesman in the Mirror: on Youtube
Buildings and Vampires: on Vimeo
A Boy and His Atom: on Motionographer

1981 births
Living people